Miah Mohammed Monsur Ali (1 January 1930 – 3 October 2015) is a Bangladesh Nationalist Party politician and the former Member of Parliament of Kushtia-7 and Chuadanga-1.

Birth and early life 
Miah Mohammed Monsur Ali was born on 1 January 1930 in Chuadanga. His father was Jasim Uddin Ahmed and his mother was Rahela Khatun.

Career
Mansur Ali was elected MNA (Member of the National Assembly) from the present Chuadanga-Meherpur and part of Jhenaidah districts in the 1965–1969 term. In the second parliamentary elections of 1979, he was elected as a Member of Parliament from the Kushtia-7 constituency comprising the then Chuadanga subdivision as a candidate of the Bangladesh Nationalist Party. He was elected to parliament from Chuadanga-1 as a Bangladesh Nationalist Party candidate in 1991.

Death 
Miah Mohammed Monsur Ali died at United Hospital in Dhaka on 3 October 2015.

References 

Bangladesh Nationalist Party politicians
5th Jatiya Sangsad members
2nd Jatiya Sangsad members
1930 births
2015 deaths
People from Chuadanga District